In excess of 2400 species of moth have been recorded in Great Britain.

This page provides a link to detailed lists of these moths by family.

Macromoths
 Hepialidae
 Cossidae
 Zygaenidae
 Limacodidae
 Sesiidae
 Lasiocampidae
 Saturniidae
 Endromidae
 Drepanidae
 Thyatiridae
 Geometridae
 Sphingidae
 Notodontidae
 Thaumetopoeidae
 Lymantriidae
 Arctiidae
 Ctenuchidae
 Nolidae
 Noctuidae

Micromoths
 Micromoths

References 
 Waring, Paul, Martin Townsend and Richard Lewington (2003) Field Guide to the Moths of Great Britain and Ireland. British Wildlife Publishing, Hook, UK. .

See also 
List of butterflies of Great Britain

Moths
Great Britain